William Clive Shaw (25 April 1915 – 5 October 1994) was an Australian rules footballer who played with Footscray in the Victorian Football League (VFL).

Shaw later served in the Australian Army during World War II.

Notes

External links 

1915 births
1994 deaths
Australian rules footballers from Victoria (Australia)
Western Bulldogs players